Ivan Sirko (tr.

Biography

Origin 
The first biography of Ivan Sirko, written by Dmytro Yavornytsky in 1890, gave Sirko's place of birth as the sloboda of Merefa near the city of Kharkiv. Historian Yuriy Mytsyik states that this could not be the case. In his book Otaman Ivan Sirko (1999) he writes that Merefa was established only in 1658 (more than 40 years after the birth of the future otaman). The author also notes that Sirko later in his life did actually live in Merefa with his family on his own estate, and according to some earlier local chronicles there even existed a small settlement called Sirkivka. However, Mytsyik also points out that in 1658–1660 Sirko served as a  colonel of the Kalnyk Polk (a military and administrative division of the Cossack Hetmanate) in Podilia, a position  usually awarded to the representative of a local population. The author also gives a reference to the letter of Ivan Samiylovych to kniaz G. Romodanovsky (the tsar's voyevoda) in which the hetman refers to Sirko as one born in Polish lands instead of in Sloboda Ukraine (part of Moscovy). Mytsyik also recalls that another historian, Volodymyr Borysenko, allowed for the possibility that Sirko was born in Murafa near the city of Sharhorod (now in Vinnytsia Oblast). The author explains during that time when people were fleeing the war (known as the Ruin, 1659–1686) they may have established a similarly named town in Sloboda Ukraine further east.

Further, Mytsyik in his book states that Sirko probably was not of Cossack heritage, but rather of the Ukrainian (Ruthenian) Orthodox szlachta. Mytsyik points out that a local Podilian nobleman, Wojciech Sirko, married a certain Olena Kozynska sometime in 1592. Also in official letters the Polish administration referred to Sirko as urodzonim, implying a native-born Polish subject. Mytsyik states that Sirko stood about 174–176 cm tall and had a birthmark on the right side of the lower lip, a detail which Ilya Repin failed to depict in his artwork when he used General Dragomirov as a prototype of the otaman. Mytsyik also recalls the letter of the Field Hetman of the Crown John III Sobieski (later king of Poland) which referred to Sirko as "a very quiet, noble, polite [man], and has ... great trust among Cossacks".

Career 
Sirko changed his political orientation several times. In 1654 he came to Zaporozhian Sich became polkovnyk (colonel) and in 1659 together with Russian prince Aleksei Trubetskoi fought against the Crimean Khanate. Although Sirko opposed the alliance with Moscow during the Pereyaslav Rada after he  became Koshovyi Otaman of the Zaporozhian Host in 1663 he won several battles against Poles, Tatars and hetman Petro Doroshenko in alliance with Muscovy. In 1664, he was one of the inspirators of an uprising in Right-bank Ukraine against Poland which is known from his letter to the Czar.

He was the first Cossack ataman to accept Kalmyks into his army. Despite his pro-Moscow orientation he distrusted and hated pro-Russian hetman Ivan Briukhovetsky, but at the same time married his son Roman to Briukhovetsky's daughter. In 1668 this rivalry even forced Ivan Sirko to switch sides again and briefly join Petro Doroshenko in his fight against "Muscovite boyars and Voivodes", but in 1670 once again Sirko pledged loyalty to Russian tsar Alexei Mikhailovich. Afterwards he captured Turkish stronghold Ochakiv and besieged Ismail which he captured.

Following the death of Demian Mnohohrishny in 1672 Sirko entered the struggle for the hetman title, but instead was sent by the Russian tsar to Tobolsk, Siberia. In 1673 he returned to Ukraine and once again  fought against Tatars and Turks, and captured the fortresses Arslan and Ochakiv. In 1675 Zaporozhian Cossacks defeated Ottoman Turkish forces in a major battle, however, the Sultan of Turkey Mehmed IV still demanded that the Cossacks submit to Turkish rule. The Cossacks led by Ivan Sirko replied in an uncharacteristic manner: they wrote a letter, replete with insults and profanities, which later became the subject of a painting by Ilya Repin. After his death, Ivan Sirko – one of the most popular otamans in Ukrainian history – was remembered as a legendary Cossack, a military genius, and became a hero of many myths, folk songs and poems.

Burial

Sirko died at his estate Hrushivka (today Soloniansky Raion, Dnipropetrovsk Oblast) on August 11 , 1680. Next day he was buried near the Chortomlynska Sich. In 1709 the Moscow Army totally destroyed the Sich and the grave of the otaman was not fixed until 1734. The Cossacks replaced the broken cross with a memorial rock that has survived to the present, but they erroneously marked the date of his death as May 4. In 1967 the Kakhovka Reservoir was threatening the otaman's burial site, causing him to be reburied near the village of Kapulivka, Nikopol Raion, but without his skull. The skull of Sirko was sent to the Leningrad laboratory for a plastic-archaeological reconstruction for the Ethnographic Institute of the Soviet Academy of Science. It was not until 1987 when writer Yuriy Mushketyk remembered the 'beheaded otaman' and wrote a letter to the Association for Preservation of History and Culture of Ukraine. The journal Pamyatky Ukrainy (Attractions of Ukraine) responded to the call of the writer and after over 20 years with the help of anthropologist Serhiy Seheda the remains of Ivan Sirko were returned to his native land.

Legacy

The otaman is widely remembered in numerous literary works of Ivan Nechuy-Levytsky, Adrian Kashchenko, Volodymyr Malyk, Mykola Zerov, Borys Modzalevsky, and many others. He is the Urus-Shaitan in Malyk's Ambassador of Urus-Shaitan. 

In 1966 when the President of France Charles de Gaulle was visiting the Soviet Union, he personally requested to bring him to the burial location of Ivan Sirko.

In August 2019 the 92nd Separate Mechanized Brigade of the Armed Forces of Ukraine was renamed after Ivan Sirko by a decree of President Volodymyr Zelensky.

References

Bibliography
Mytsyik, Yuriy. Otaman Ivan Sirko. Zaporizka Spadschyna (Zaporizhian Heritage), Ed.11. Zaporizhia: RA "Tandem-U", 1999.
Evarnitsky, D. Ivan Dmitrievich Sirko, glavnyi koshevoi ataman zaporozhskikh nizovykh kazakov (Ivan Sirko, The Chief Kosh Otaman of Zaporizhian Cossacks). Saint-Petersburg, 1894.

External links
 Ivan Sirko at the Encyclopedia of Ukraine
 Mysyk, Yu. Legendary Kosh Otaman Ivan Sirko. Krymska Svitlytsia (from "Ukrayina Kozatska"). 17 August 2007
 Seheda, S. ''The skull of the Kosh Otaman Ivan Sirko two years was laying in my apartment. Gazette in Ukrainian. 29 January 2010.
Ivan Sirko
biography of Serko Ivan Dmitrievich (Sirko) - in Russian.

1610 births
1680 deaths
People from Bracław Voivodeship
Ruthenian nobility
Zaporozhian Cossack nobility
Zaporozhian Cossack military personnel of the Khmelnytsky Uprising
Ukrainian people of the Russo-Polish War (1654–1667)
People of the Thirty Years' War
Kosh Otamans
Colonels of the Cossack Hetmanate